Cursor may refer to:

 Cursor (user interface), an indicator used to show the current position for user interaction on a computer monitor or other display device
 Cursor (databases), a control structure that enables traversal over the records in a database
 Cursor, a value that is the position of an object in some known data structure, a predecessor of pointers
 Cursor (slide rule), indicates corresponding points on scales that are not adjacent to each other
 Cursor Models, made for the Mercedes Benz Museum, and as promotional models
 Cursor (magazine), an early magazine distributed on cassette from 1978 and into the early 1980s
 Cursor, a holographic sidekick character from the TV series Automan

See also
Pointer (graphical user interfaces), commonly called a mouse cursor.